Sergio Tòfano (20 August 1886 – 28 October 1973) was an Italian actor, director, playwright, scene designer and illustrator.

Tofano was born in Rome. In 1909, he made his first appearance on stage with Ermete Novelli, then joined Virgilio Talli's company (1913–23). He soon specialized as a comic actor, giving his role a new elegance and complexity. He worked with other famous actors and directors: Dario Niccodemi (1924–27); Luigi Almirante and Giuditta Rissone (1927–30), Elsa Merlini, Vittorio De Sica, Evi Maltagliati, Gino Cervi etc. During those years, he made his famous performances as Doctor Knock in Jules Romains' play, and as Professor Toti in Luigi Pirandello's Pensaci, Giacomino!. He also led important theatrical firms.

After the Second World War, he worked with the most important directors, like Luchino Visconti and Giorgio Strehler.

In 1917 Tofano invented, for a children's magazine, Il Corriere dei Piccoli, a famous character, Signor Bonaventura, whose adventures lasted for more than forty years. He used to sign as Sto. He wrote and illustrated several children's books and  illustrated The Chess Set in the Mirror by Massimo Bontempelli.

Partial filmography

Tigrana (1916, dir. by Edouard Micheroux de Dillon)
The Private Secretary (1931, dir. by Goffredo Alessandrini) - Otello, l'usciere
Your Money or Your Life (1932, dir. by Carlo Ludovico Bragaglia) - Daniele
The Telephone Operator (1932, dir. by Nunzio Malasomma) - Bàttigo - the tenor
Paprika (1933, dir. by Carl Boese) - Checco
The Girl with the Bruise (1933, dir. by E. W. Emo)
Seconda B (1934, dir. by Goffredo Alessandrini) - Professore Monti
Lohengrin (1936, dir. by Nunzio Malasomma) - Giulio
The Two Misanthropists (1937, dir. by Amleto Palermi) - Cosimo Bertelet
Tonight at Eleven (1938, dir. by Oreste Biancoli) - Il colonnello Muffon
Jeanne Doré (1938, dir. by Mario Bonnard) - Fanard
Inventiamo l'amore (1938, dir. by Camillo Mastrocinque) - Borghetti
The Sons of the Marquis Lucera (1939, dir. by Amleto Palermi) - Vigna
Eravamo sette sorelle (1939, dir. by Mario Mattoli) - Antonio, il maggiordomo
Le sorprese del divorzio (1939, dir. by Guido Brignone) - Fernand Corbulon
Father For a Night (1939, dir. by Mario Bonnard) - Edmondo Fontages
Follie del secolo (1939, dir. by Amleto Palermi) - Il barone Giorgio
The Silent Partner (1939) - L'affaristo in borsa
Validità giorni dieci (1940, dir. by Camillo Mastrocinque) - Maurizio
Giù il sipario (1940, dir. by Raffaello Matarazzo) - Il capocomico
La granduchessa si diverte (1940, dir. by Giacomo Gentilomo) - Il principe
Una famiglia impossibile (1940, dir. by Carlo Ludovico Bragaglia) - Il maggiordomo
Idyll in Budapest (1941, dir. by Giorgio Ansoldi) - Altezza
Il signore a doppio petto (1941, dir. by Flavio Calzavara) - Il signore Bisaccia
Cenerentola e il signor Bonaventura (1941, anche soggetto e regia) - Il dottore (uncredited)
Se io fossi onesto (1942, dir. by Carlo Ludovico Bragaglia) - Vittorio, il maggiordomo
Disturbance (1942, dir. by Guido Brignone) - Antonio, padre di Silvia
 Souls in Turmoil (1942, dir. by Giulio Del Torre) - Perego
La guardia del corpo (1942, dir. by Carlo Ludovico Bragaglia) - L'avvocato Paolo, suo marito
Quarta pagina (1943, dir. by Nicola Manzari) - Il professore naturalista
Gian Burrasca (1943, anche regia) - Il maestro di pianoforte
Il fidanzato di mia moglie (1943, dir. by Carlo Ludovico Bragaglia) - Il giudice Ernesto Torriani
La maschera e il volto (1943, dir. by Camillo Mastrocinque) - Cirillo
Il cavaliere del sogno (1947, dir. by Camillo Mmastrocinque) - Il maestro Zingarelli
Fabiola (1949, dir. by Alessandro Blasetti) - Luciano
Abbiamo vinto! (1951, dir. by Robert A. Stemmle) - Temistocle Leoni
Napoleon (1951, dir. by Carlo Borghesio) - Vignon
Altri tempi (1952, dir. by Alessandro Blasetti) - Nonno di Guido (segment "L'idillio")
La Fiammata (1952, dir. by Alessandro Blasetti) - Belmont
 Guilt Is Not Mine (1952, dir. by Giuseppe Masini) - Prof. Valli
Puccini (1953, dir. by Carmine Gallone) - Giulio Ricordi
The Country of the Campanelli (1954, dir. by Jean Boyer) - Dott. Pott
House of Ricordi (1954, dir. by Carmine Gallone) - Cesarini Sforza
 Cardinal Lambertini (1954, dir. by Giorgio Pastina) - Canonico Peggi
La bella di Roma (1955, dir. by Luigi Comencini) - Agostino
Andrea Chenier (1955, dir. by Clemente Fracassi) - Luigi Chénier
Porta un bacione a Firenze (1956, dir. by Camillo Mastrocinque) - Giovanni
Io, Caterina (1957)
La vita degli altri (1957) - Linari
Dreams in a Drawer (1957, dir. by Renato Castellani) - Lucia's Father
Il bacio del sole (Don Vesuvio) (1958)
Il re di Poggioreale (1961, dir. by Duilio Coletti) - Il contente Pignatelli
La costanza della ragione (1964, dir. by Pasquale Festa Campanile) - Don Bonifazi
Napoleone a Firenze (1964)
Il padre di famiglia (1967, dir. by Nanni Loy) - General
Partner (1968, dir. by Bernardo Bertolucci) - Professor Petrushka
Toh, è morta la nonna! (1969, dir. by Mario Monicelli) - The Grandfather
Contestazone generale (1970, dir. by Luigi Zampa) - Bishop
La colonna infame (1973, dir. by Nelo Risi) - Il presidente del senato
Rugantino (1973, dir. by Pasquale Festa Campanile) - Marchese Michele Sacconi

References

External links

1880s births
1973 deaths
Italian male stage actors
Italian male film actors
Italian dramatists and playwrights
20th-century Italian male actors
20th-century Italian dramatists and playwrights
Italian children's book illustrators